Cape Finniss (also spelt Cape Finnis) is a headland located at the southern extremity of Anxious Bay on the west coast of Eyre Peninsula in South Australia about  Northwest by west of the town of Elliston.

References

f
Eyre Peninsula